Convent of Jesus and Mary High School (CJM) is an English medium school in Ranaghat, Nadia, in the state of West Bengal, India. It is the only private non profit Co-education school run by nuns in the district of Nadia. The school is affiliated up to Class XII.

History 
The school started in 1996 with a small number of students but now it has more than a thousand students. The school follows the Indian Certificate of Secondary Education syllabus and has a number of experienced teachers. To date four batches of students have passed the ICSE exam.

Pass records
2006: recorded 98% pass
2007: recorded 100% pass
2008: recorded 97% pass
2009: recorded 99% pass
2010: recorded 100% pass
2011: recorded 100% pass
2015: recorded 95% pass
2016: recorded 97% pass
2017: recorded 98% pass
2018: recorded 97% pass

References

Catholic secondary schools in India
Christian schools in West Bengal
High schools and secondary schools in West Bengal
Schools in Nadia district
Educational institutions established in 1996
1996 establishments in West Bengal